Grindelia oxylepis, the Mexican gumweed, is a North American species of flowering plants in the family Asteraceae. It is native to northern Mexico, in the States of Chihuahua, Coahuila, Durango, San Luis Potosí, and Zacatecas. The natural range barely crosses the Río Grande into the United States, with a few populations in western Texas and southern New Mexico

Grindelia oxylepis  grows in moist valleys and fields. The plant usually produces numerous flower heads in open, branching arrays. Each head has 20-30 ray flowers, surrounding a large number of tiny disc flowers.

References

External links
photo of herbarium specimen at Missouri Botanical Garden, collected in Durango in 1898

oxylepis
Flora of Mexico
Flora of the Southwestern United States
Flora of New Mexico
Plants described in 1899